Christ Church Boat Club is a rowing club for members of Christ Church, Oxford and Kellogg College, Oxford. It is based on the Isis at Boathouse Island, Christ Church Meadow, Oxford.

History
The club is reputedly one of the oldest rowing clubs in the world being founded before 1817. In 1817 the house crew won the title 'Head of the River' and in 1828 became the first Oxford crew to row against a crew from outside of the University, when racing Leander in London. In the inaugural 1829 boat race there were five rowers from Christ Church.  Shortly after the admittance of women a crew was formed and raced for the first time in 1981. More recently three women competed in the 2019 boat race.

Honours

Henley Royal Regatta

See also
University rowing (UK)
Oxford University Boat Club
Christ Church, Oxford
Rowing on the River Thames

References

Rowing clubs of the University of Oxford
Christ Church, Oxford
Rowing clubs in Oxfordshire
Rowing clubs of the River Thames
Sport in Oxford
Rowing clubs in England